BabyBjörn is a Swedish family-owned company specializing in the manufacturing and marketing of baby products. It was founded in 1961 by Björn Jakobson and his sister-in-law Elsa Jakobson, who in 2012 was awarded His Majesty The King’s Medal “for significant contributions to Swedish industry”.

The company’s first product was a bouncing cradle, but today Babybjörn is best known for its baby carriers. Its first baby carrier was made in 1973.

"Since our start in 1961, our purpose is still to develop safe and well-designed products to make everyday life for parents and babies easier and even more fun. We warmly welcome your growing family to ours!" During the 1980s, Babybjörn began to be sold in the USA and Japan. Today, Babybjörn's products are sold in over 50 countries.

BabyBjörn has received numerous awards for its designs over the years, among them IDSA’s award Design of the Decade and the Red Dot Design Award.

BabyBjörn has international subsidiaries, reaching across the globe, including Europe, North America, Japan, China, South East Asia, and Korea.

The current product assortment consists of Baby Carriers, Bouncers, Travel Cots, Sleep, along with Bath and Kitchen assortments.

In September 2019, Stina Westerstad took over as CEO of the company.

References

External links
Official website

Infant products companies
Manufacturing companies established in 1961
Swedish companies established in 1961